Bomba is a settlement located in the nation of Belize. It is a mainland village located in Belize District. On November 1, 2016 it was announced that the residents now have electricity. 

Populated places in Belize District
Belize Rural North